Fulham was a local government district within the metropolitan area of London, England from 1855 to 1886. It was formed by the Metropolis Management Act 1855 and was governed by the Fulham District Board of Works, which consisted of elected vestrymen. It was in the part of the county of Middlesex that was within the area of the Metropolitan Board of Works. It occupied broadly the same area as ancient parish of Fulham and that of the current London Borough of Hammersmith and Fulham.

Area
The district comprised the civil parishes of Fulham and Hammersmith. 

Under the Metropolis Management Act 1855 any parish that exceeded 2,000 ratepayers was to be divided into wards; however the parishes of Fulham District Board of Works did not exceed this number so were not divided into wards.

In 1873 the population had increased enough for the parish of Hammersmith to be divided into three wards (electing vestrymen): North (24), Centre (27) and South (21).

In 1883-84 the population had increased enough for the parish of Fulham to also be divided into three wards (electing vestrymen): North End (27), Walham (27) and South Fulham (18).

Governance
24 members of the district board came from Hammersmith and 15 from Fulham. The district board nominated one member to the Metropolitan Board of Works.

Abolition
The district was abolished in 1886 following the Metropolis Management Amendment Act 1885 with the vestry of each parish taking on local administration. Each parish would go on to form a metropolitan borough in the County of London in 1900. These two were merged in 1965 to form the London Borough of Hammersmith.

References

History of the London Borough of Hammersmith and Fulham
Districts (Metropolis)
Fulham